Wakool Shire was a local government area in the Riverina region of New South Wales, Australia. The Shire was located between the Murray River and the Murrumbidgee River and adjacent to the Sturt Highway.  Towns in the Shire are Barham, Moulamein, Tooleybuc, Wakool and Koraleigh.

The last mayor of Wakool Shire was Clr. Neil Gorey, an unaligned politician.

Amalgamation

Wakool Shire was abolished on 12 May 2016 and along with neighbouring Murray Shire, the area was included in the Murray River Council local government area.

Council

Composition and election method
At the time of dissolution, Wakool Shire Council was composed of six councillors elected proportionally as three separate wards, each electing two councillors. All councillors were elected for a fixed four-year term of office. The mayor was elected by the councillors at the first meeting of the council. The most recent election was held on 8 September 2012. In the B and C Wards, only two candidates, being those below, nominated for election. There being no additional candidates, the election for these wards was uncontested. In the A Ward, an election was held. The makeup of the council is as follows:

The current Council, elected in 2012, in order of election, is:

References

Former local government areas of New South Wales
2016 disestablishments in Australia